Mitchell Frei (born 9 February 1992) is an Australian professional rugby league footballer who plays for the Souths Logan Magpies in the Intrust Super Cup.

Background
Born in Brisbane, Queensland, Frei is of German and South African descent and played his junior rugby league for the Albany Creek Crushers, before being signed by the Brisbane Broncos.

Frei is the son of Australian former cricketer Harry Frei, his younger brothers Brendan and Jackson are also rugby league players.

Playing career

Early career
From 2010 to 2012, Frei played for the Brisbane Broncos' NYC team. On 21 April 2012, he played for the Queensland under-20s team against the New South Wales under-20s team. On 13 November 2012, he signed a 1-year contract with the Newcastle Knights starting in 2013. After playing in the New South Wales Cup and failing to play a first-grade game for the Knights, he joined the Wynnum Manly Seagulls in the Queensland Cup in 2014. On 9 July 2014, he played for the Queensland Residents against the New South Wales Residents. On 3 May 2015, he again played for the Queensland Residents against the New South Wales Residents. In May 2015, he signed a 1-year contract with the Sydney Roosters starting in 2016. On 11 September 2015, he was named the Queensland Cup Lock of the Year.

2016
In Round 3 of the 2016 NRL season, Frei made his NRL debut for the Roosters against the North Queensland Cowboys, coming off the interchange bench in the Roosters' 0-40 loss at 1300SMILES Stadium. At years end he left the Roosters to join Wynnum-Manly Seagulls in the Queensland Cup.

References

External links
2016 Sydney Roosters profile

1992 births
Australian people of German descent
Australian people of South African descent
Australian rugby league players
Sydney Roosters players
Wynnum Manly Seagulls players
Rugby league second-rows
Rugby league locks
Living people
Rugby league players from Brisbane